Cicada is a genus of old world cicadas in the family Cicadidae, and the tribe Cicadini. There are at least 60 described species in Cicada.

Species
The following species belong to the genus Cicada:

 Cicada aichorni Heer, 1853 c g
 Cicada albicans Walker & F., 1858 c g
 Cicada albida Gmelin, 1789 i c g
 Cicada americana Gmelin, 1789 i c
 Cicada asius Walker & F., 1850 c g
 Cicada atomaria Fabricius, 1794 g
 Cicada barbara (Stal, 1866) c g
 Cicada benghalensis Houttuyn, 1787 g
 Cicada bimaculata Houttuyn, 1787 g
 Cicada brazilensis Metcalf, 1963 i c
 Cicada cantillans Houttuyn, 1787 g
 Cicada casmatmema Capanni, 1894 c g
 Cicada cerisyi Guérin-Méneville, 1844 c g
 Cicada cinerea
 Cicada clarisona Hancock, 1834 i c
 Cicada collaris De Geer, 1773 i c
 Cicada complex Walker & F., 1850 c g
 Cicada confusa Metcalf, 1963 i c g
 Cicada cretensis Quartau & Simoes, 2005 c g
 Cicada dipalliata
 Cicada dominula Houttuyn, 1787 g
 Cicada effecta Walker, 1858 i c
 Cicada egregia Uhler, 1903 i
 Cicada forsythii Buckton, 1891 c g
 Cicada fuscomaculata Goeze, 1778 c g
 Cicada goezei Metcalf, 1963 c g
 Cicada grandiosa Scudder, 1892 c g
 Cicada guttata Forster, 1771 i c
 Cicada javanensis Metcalf, 1963 c g
 Cicada kirkaldyi Metcalf, 1963 i c g
 Cicada leucothoe Walker, 1852 i c
 Cicada lineola
 Cicada lineolata
 Cicada lodosi Boulard, 1979 c g
 Cicada mannifica Forskal, 1775 c g
 Cicada melanaria Germar, 1830 i c
 Cicada melanoptera Gmelin, 1789 i c g
 Cicada mordoganensis Boulard, 1979 c g
 Cicada muscilliformis
 Cicada muscoides Houttuyn, 1787 g
 Cicada nigropunctata Goeze, 1778 i c g
 Cicada nodosa
 Cicada novella Metcalf, 1963 i c g
 Cicada olivierana Metcalf, 1963 c g
 Cicada opercularis Olivier, 1790 c g
 Cicada orni Linnaeus, 1758 - type species
 Cicada palearctica
 Cicada pallens
 Cicada pallida Goeze, 1778 c g
 Cicada pennata (Distant, 1881) i
 Cicada permagna (Haupt, 1917) c g
 Cicada poae
 Cicada proserpina Weyenbergh, H. & Jr., 1874 c g
 Cicada purpurescens Metcalf, 1963 i c g
 Cicada quadristriata Gmelin, 1790 g
 Cicada regina Graber & V., 1876 c g
 Cicada rubicunda Houttuyn, 1787 g
 Cicada sahlbergi Stål, 1854 i c
 Cicada sebai Metcalf, 1963 c g
 Cicada thalassina Germar, 1830 i c
 Cicada turtoni Metcalf, 1963 i c g
 Cicada ungeri Heer, 1853 c g
 Cicada variegata Houttuyn, 1787 g
 Cicada virescens Fabricius, 1794 g

Data sources: i = ITIS, c = Catalogue of Life, g = GBIF, b = Bugguide.net

References

External links

 
 

 
Cicadidae genera